USS Fort Henry was a gunboat which saw service with the Union Navy during the American Civil War. Originally designed as a ferryboat, she was purchased by the Navy before entering commercial service and converted into a fighting vessel. During the war, she took part in the naval blockade of the Confederacy and captured a number of blockade runners. After the war, she was sold to a New York ferry company. Renamed Huntington, she operated for about two years as an East River ferry before being destroyed by fire in 1868.

Construction and design 

Fort Henry was originally one of a batch of six ferryboats ordered by the Union Ferry Company for service on the East River between Manhattan and Brooklyn. A wooden-hulled sidewheeler, Fort Henry was built in Brooklyn in 1861-62. She was named after a Confederate fort on the Tennessee River recently conquered by Union forces.

She had a registered tonnage of 552, and in later naval service, a displacement of 519 long tons. While the engine type is undocumented, Fort Henrys bore and stroke were identical to that of the other five ferries built at the same time for the Union Ferry Co., four of which are known to have been fitted with inclined engines.

Before she could enter commercial service, Fort Henry was purchased by the US Navy on 25 March 1862 for the sum of $69,689.74. After purchase, the Navy converted the vessel into a gunboat, which included fitting her with two 9-inch smoothbore cannon and four 32-pounder guns. On 3 April 1862, she was commissioned as USS Fort Henry, Acting Lieutenant J. C. Walsh in command.

Service history 

Assigned to the East Gulf Blockading Squadron, Fort Henry arrived at Key West, Florida, 2 June 1862 for blockade duty in the vicinity of St. George Sound and the Cedar Keys. Highly successful in apprehending blockade runners, she took one sloop in 1862, and in 1863, took four schooners, four sloops, and one smaller craft. In April 1863, with St. Lawrence and Sagamore, she made an expedition to scour the coast between the Suwannee River and Anclote Keys. A sloop was taken off Bayport, Florida, 9 April, where the group engaged an enemy battery and set a schooner aflame with its fire.

On 20 July 1863, Fort Henry sent her launch to reconnoiter the Crystal River, an expedition in which two of her men were killed by fire from the shore.

She sailed north in June 1865, arriving at New York City 19 June, where she was decommissioned 8 July 1865. The following month, Fort Henry along with a number of other decommissioned US Navy ships were put up for auction at New York by Burdett, Jones & Co. On 15 August, Fort Henry was sold for $18,500, and passed into the hands of the Long Island Rail Road.

Renamed Huntington, the vessel entered commercial service as a ferry, operating between Manhattan and Hunter's Point, Queens. While still in this service, she was burned to the waterline at Hunter's Point on 22 February 1868. Her estimated value at the time of her loss was $55,000, of which $15,000 was covered by insurance.

Footnotes

References

Bibliography  
  
 

1862 ships
Ships of the Union Navy
Gunboats of the United States Navy
Steamships of the United States Navy
Ferryboats of the Union Ferry Company
Ferryboats of the Long Island Rail Road